Belan river (बेलन नदी) is a river in Indian state of Uttar Pradesh.it Originates from Western part of Sonbhadra district Uttar Pradesh.It is famous for prehistoric sites on its banks.

Origination
It originates from western part of Sonbhadra district then flows in southern part of Mirzapur and Prayagraj districts.

Confluence
In Prayagraj district it confluence with Tons river nearby NH-27 and Tonki village.

Historical importance

It is famous for prehistoric sites, which is related with Neolithic, periods. Chopanimando is for pottery making and Koldihwa for cereals like rice.  (both in Prayagraj district) are two important excavated sites, located on the northern fringes of Vindhyas on the banks of the Belan river.

References

Rivers of Uttar Pradesh
Sonbhadra district